Jean de Brunhoff (9 December 1899 – 16 October 1937) was a French writer and illustrator remembered best for creating the Babar series of children's books concerning a fictional elephant, the first of which was published in 1931.

Early life
De Brunhoff was the fourth and youngest child of Maurice de Brunhoff, a publisher, and his wife Marguerite. He attended Protestant schools, including the prestigious École Alsacienne. Brunhoff joined the army and was sent to the front when World War I was almost over. Afterward, he decided to be a professional artist and studied painting at the Académie de la Grande Chaumière in Paris. In 1924, he married Cécile Sabouraud, a talented pianist, and they had two sons, Laurent and Mathieu, born in 1925 and 1926; a third son, Thierry, was born nine years later.

Babar
The Babar books began as a bedtime story that Cécile de Brunhoff invented for their children, Mathieu and Laurent, when they were four and five years old, respectively. She was allegedly trying to comfort Mathieu, who was sick. The boys liked the story of the little elephant who left the jungle for a city resembling Paris so much that they asked their father, a painter, to illustrate it.  He made it into a picture book, with text, which was published by a family-owned publishing house, Le Jardin des Modes. Originally, it was planned that the book's title page would describe the story as told by Jean and Cécile de Brunhoff. However, she had her name omitted. Due to the role she played in the genesis of the Babar story, some sources refer to her as the creator of the Babar story.

After the first book Histoire de Babar (The Story of Babar), five more titles followed before Jean de Brunhoff died of tuberculosis at the age of 37. He is buried in Père Lachaise Cemetery in Paris.

After Jean's death, his brother Michel de Brunhoff, who was the editor of the magazine Vogue Paris, oversaw the publication in book form of Jean's two last books, Babar and His Children and Babar and Father Christmas, both of which had been drawn in black and white for a British newspaper, The Daily Sketch. Michel de Brunhoff arranged for the black and white drawings to be painted in color, with the then-thirteen-year-old Laurent helping with the work. The French publishing house Hachette later bought the rights to the Babar series. The first six Babar books were reprinted with millions of copies sold around the world.

Babar revived
Soon after the end of World War II, Laurent, who had become an artistic painter like his father and had also studied at the Académie de la Grande Chaumière, began work on a Babar book of his own. Although his style of painting was different from his father's and he emphasized picture more than text in the creation of his books, he trained himself to draw elephants in strict accord with the style of his father. Consequently, many people did not notice any difference in authorship and assumed the six-year gap in the series was because of the war. Laurent has always been careful to emphasize that Babar was his father's creation (and to some extent his mother's) and that he continued the series largely as a way of keeping the memory of his father and his own childhood alive.

Death

Jean de Brunhoff died on October 16, 1937, from tuberculosis.

Bibliography
The Story of Babar. New York: Harrison Smith and Robert Haas, 1934
The Travels of Babar. New York: Harrison Smith and Robert Haas, 1934
Babar the King. New York: Harrison Smith and Robert Haas, 1935
A.B.C. of Babar. New York: Random House, 1936 (out of print)
Zephir's Holidays (also published as Babar and Zephir and Babar's Friend Zephir). New York: Random House, 1937
Babar and His Children. New York: Random House, 1938
Babar and Father Christmas. New York: Random House, 1940

Further reading

Jean and Laurent de Brunhoff, Babar's Anniversary Album: Six Favorite Stories, with an Introduction by Maurice Sendak and family photos and captions by Laurent de Brunhoff (New York: Random House, 1981). 
Sendak's introduction reprinted in Sendak's Caldecott & Co.: Notes on Books and Pictures (New York: Noonday Press, 1990).
Ann Hildebrand, Jean and Laurent de Brunhoff: The Legacy of Babar (New York: Twayne, 1991).
Christine Nelson, Drawing Babar: Early Drafts and Watercolors (New York: The Morgan Library and Museum, 2008).
Nicholas Fox Weber, The Art of Babar (New York: Harry N. Abrams, 1989). Dorothée Charles, Les Histoires de Babar (Paris: Les Arts Décoratifs/ Bibliothèque nationale de France, 2011).

References

External links
 Lambiek Comiclopedia article about Jean de Brunhoff.

1899 births
1937 deaths
Writers from Paris
French Army soldiers
French military personnel of World War I
Burials at Père Lachaise Cemetery
20th-century deaths from tuberculosis
French children's writers
French children's book illustrators
French illustrators
Writers who illustrated their own writing
Tuberculosis deaths in Switzerland
Alumni of the Académie de la Grande Chaumière
French male non-fiction writers
Babar the Elephant